Lupe Anguiano (born 12 March 1929) is an American civil rights activist known for her work on women's rights, the rights of the poor, and the protection of the environment. She is credited with bringing religious support and helping  reframe religious debates to include these nationwide issues.

Biography
Anguiano was the fourth of six children born to a Mexican-American migrant family who moved from Colorado to California between May and December to harvest fruit, vegetables and nuts. She earned a master's degree in administration and education from Antioch College.

Anguiano joined Our Lady of Victory Missionary Sisters from 1949 to 1964. She chose the order for their reputation being advocates for the poor. She left the church after joining picket lines and protesting a prospective law set out by the California Association of Realtors to reverse the 1963 Rumford Fair Housing Act, which banned racial discrimination by landlords.

Anguiano went on to work with the Department of Health, Education and Welfare in 1965. She also consulted with government agencies and testified before state and national legislative bodies. She worked with Cesar Chavez, and in Michigan where she led the grape boycott of 1965. After leaving her post in the government, she focused on the welfare system as a result of becoming “angry at the way in which the system traps young, healthy, and intelligent women; makes them dependent on welfare; destroys their pride and their willingness to work; and keeps them living always under the poverty level.” In 1973, her disillusionment led her back to San Antonio where she became national organizer for the United Farm Workers and founded the National Women’s Employment & Education Inc, which helps single female parents move beyond welfare poverty.

She is a founding member of the National Women's Political Caucus, along with Gloria Steinem and Bella Abzug, and has worked on behalf of the Equal Rights Amendment. Anguiano was a delegate to the historic "First Women's Conference" in Houston in 1977, where she, Jean Stapleton, and Coretta Scott King read the "Declaration of American Women." In 1996, Congress passed landmark welfare reform legislation that contained many of her ideas.

She currently volunteers at the California Coastal Protection Network, the Pacific Environment, and other environmental organizations. Her papers are housed at the UCLA Chicano Studies Research Center.

In 2007, she was designated a Women's History Month Honoree by the National Women's History Project.

Awards
 35th California Assembly District Woman of the Year
 President’s Volunteer Award, 1983
 Women's History Month Honoree by the National Women's History Project, 2007

References

Further reading

External links
 National Women's Political Caucus
 National Women's History Project
 Opening of the Lupe Anguiano Archive at UCLA Celebrates a Life Devoted to Social Justice
 Lupe Anguiano Biography Announcement

1929 births
Living people
American feminists
American trade union leaders
People from Oxnard, California
Roman Catholic activists
American anti-poverty advocates
Trade unionists from California
American women trade unionists